"44 Minutes" (song), a 2009 song by Megadeth
44 Minutes: The North Hollywood Shoot-Out, a 2003 American television film